Slow to Burn is the second solo album by singer Vanessa Daou, released in 1996.

Track listing
"How Do You Feel" - 3:48  
"Evening" - 3:40  
"Taste The Wine" - 4:01  
"If I Could (What I Would Do)" - 3:32  
"Waiting For The Sun To Rise" - 4:17  
"Fugue States" - 2:45  
"Don't Explain" - 4:05  
"Two To Tango" - 4:21  
"This Blue Hour" - 3:49  
"For Anything" - 2:56  
"Cross That Bridge" - 3:55

Singles
"Two To Tango"  
"How Do You Feel"

References

1996 albums
Vanessa Daou albums